Naval Outlying Landing Field Spencer  is a military airport located two miles (3 km) northeast of Pace, Florida, United States, in Santa Rosa County. It is owned by the United States Navy.

These runways are arranged to make two squares, one whose vertices approximately point north, south, east and west, and another which lies directly on top but is rotated 45°.

Its mission is to support helicopter operations of the Naval Air Training Command, and it remains under the control of Commander, Training Air Wing FIVE at nearby NAS Whiting Field.

Although most U.S. airports use the same three-letter location identifier for the FAA and IATA, Naval Outlying Landing Field Spencer is assigned NRQ by the FAA but has no designation from the IATA.

See also
Naval outlying landing field

References

External links
NOLF Spencer at GlobalSecurity.org

Airports in Florida
Transportation buildings and structures in Santa Rosa County, Florida
Spencer